Harrison Township, Nebraska may refer to the following places:

 Harrison Township, Buffalo County, Nebraska
 Harrison Township, Knox County, Nebraska

See also
Harrison Township (disambiguation)

Nebraska township disambiguation pages